Good God may refer to:

"Good God" (Korn song), a 1996 song by Korn
"Good God" (Anouk song), a 2007 song by Anouk
Good God (TV series), a Canadian television series which premiered in 2012

See also 
 Good Grief (disambiguation)
 God Is Good (disambiguation)